Emigrate is the debut studio album by the industrial rock band Emigrate. It was released on August 31, 2007 in Europe and on January 29, 2008 in the United States and in Australia via Motor Music. Recording sessions took place at Puk Recording Studios in Denmark. Production was handled by Richard Kruspe with Jacob Hellner, Arnaud Giroux and Olsen Involtini.

Track listing

Personnel
Richard Kruspe – lyrics, guitars, vocals, producer
Caron Bernstein – lyrics
Margaux Bossieux – backing vocals (tracks: 2, 3, 6, 7, 9)
Grace Risch – backing vocals (track 11)
Ruth Renner – backing vocals (track 11)
Arnaud Giroux – bass, vocal recording and production, co-producer
Olsen Involtini – additional guitar, vocal recording and production, co-producer
Henka Johansson – drums
Sascha Moser – programming (Logic and Pro Tools)
Ulf Kruckenberg – drum engineering
Jacob Hellner – co-producer
Stefan Glaumann – mixing
Howie Weinberg – mastering
Dirk Rudolph – design
Felix Broede – photography

Charts

References

External links

2007 debut albums
Emigrate (band) albums